The American College of Toxicology (ACT) is a professional association dedicated to providing an interactive forum for the advancement and exchange of scientific information in the field of toxicology.

Mission 
The mission of the American College of Toxicology is to educate, lead, and serve professionals in toxicology and related disciplines by promoting the exchange of information and perspectives on applied toxicology and safety assessment. ACT provides a forum for collegiate exchange of information and provides educational opportunities including Symposia, Workshops, and Continuing Education (CE) courses offered at the annual scientific meeting, as well as podcasts, webinars, and multi-day training courses in basic, advanced, or specialty toxicology which are held throughout the year.

ACT publishes the  International Journal of Toxicology, which offers publishing opportunities for researchers and provides cutting-edge, cross-disciplinary scientific data and opinions.
 
The strategic goals of ACT include delivering educational excellence, advancing professional development, and advancing ACT’s impact.

History 
Founded in 1977, ACT was originally established to provide an organization for scientists in the field of toxicology with the goals of advancing the field of toxicology and acting as a forum for the exchange of information between regulators, academia, and industry.  Although the initial focus was for environmental concerns, the College quickly grew to encompass all of applied toxicology, with actions including holding a joint symposium with the Society for Risk Assessment, and organizing a task force that would eventually grow to become the Academy of Toxicological Sciences (ATS). The College was also one of the first societies to offer Continuing Education courses and established the triennial Salary Survey, that continues today as a valuable resource to those in the field.

Membership
ACT membership includes more than 1100 toxicologists (as of 2022) from over 21 countries who work in academia, industry, government regulatory agencies, or as private consultants. Any person who is qualified, by virtue of training and experience, and is actively involved in toxicology through administration, teaching, research, or safety assessment, and who is functioning as a scientist or professional in toxicology is eligible for Full membership. Full members must have at a minimum an earned baccalaureate degree from a recognized college or university, five years of experience directly related to toxicology and fulfill one or more of the following requirements: formal advanced training in toxicology or related field, at least one peer-reviewed publication on a topic relevant to toxicology, or board certification in a subject relevant to toxicology.  Associate and Student memberships are available for individuals who do not fulfill the professional requirements for Full membership. Corporate memberships are also available, as well as Honorary and Distinguished Fellow status, which are conferred by Council.

Council
ACT Council serves as the Board of Directors for the College, jointly overseeing and providing general administration, direction, and management of the affairs of the College. This body consists of both member-elected positions, including the President, President-Elect, Vice President, Secretary, Treasurer, immediate Past President, and Councilors (total of nine), plus a Council-elected position, the Editor-in-Chief of the International Journal of Toxicology. Execution and high-level administration of Council-related activities, as well as the overall management of many subsidiary functions, is the responsibility of the Executive Director. The ACT Council freely offers advice and/or ideas based on knowledge and experience and serves as a liaison for solicited and unsolicited opinions and ideas between Council and members of the College.

International Journal of Toxicology
The International Journal of Toxicology (IJT) is the official publication of ACT, offering academic, industry, and regulatory toxicologists,
as well as toxicology consultants, timely, peer-reviewed, multidisciplinary articles and incisive reviews on contemporary issue in toxicology, plus safety assessments, novel approaches to toxicological testing, mechanisms of toxicity, biomarkers, and risk assessment. Each of the six annual issues provides an important forum for articles that promote basic toxicology research as well as those that facilitate and improve toxicology practice. The Journal also publishes invited reviews, articles based on symposia, book and media reviews, and editorials. Three supplemental issues each year are devoted to contributions from the Cosmetic Ingredient Review Expert Panel of the Personal Care Products Council (formerly the Cosmetic, Toiletry, and Fragrance Association [CTFA]). Each year, ACT recognizes the authors of one manuscript published in the journal with the Award for Best Paper Published in International Journal of Toxicology. The award consists of a cash prize and a plaque.  The award is announced and presented at the Annual Meeting during the Awards Ceremony.

Annual scientific meeting
The Annual Meeting provides a venue for keeping abreast of emerging trends in the discipline of toxicology, for staying connected with friends and colleagues, and for making new connections. ACT Council and our Program and Education Committees ensure development of Symposia, Workshops, and Continuing Education courses that are directly applicable to the daily practice of toxicology. ACT’s Annual Meeting is ideal for those who enjoy interacting with speakers, Council, and other colleagues in the field.

The ACT Annual Meeting offers a blend of educational content and opportunities for interpersonal engagement for toxicologists.  Each year’s Annual Meeting includes a world-class scientific program, a welcome reception, a poster reception session, a members-only mixer, a 5K fun run (named the ToxTrot), and more social events in the exhibit hall to enhance broad interactions among attendees, students, and exhibitors.  At the Annual Meeting there is an Awards Ceremony (open to all registrants) in which award recipients are recognized prior to a keynote presentation by the Distinguished Scientist Award in Toxicology recipient.

Awards, Grants, and Fellowships
 ACT Distinguished Fellow
 Distinguished Scientist Award in Toxicology
 Service Award
 Early Career Professional Award
 Carol C. Lemire Unsung Hero Award
 Best Paper Published in the International Journal of Toxicology
 International Travel Grants
 North American Travel Grants
 Furst Award
 North American Graduate Fellowships

References

External links
Official website
Reference in Encyclopedia of Toxicology, 2014

1979 establishments in the United States
Health care-related professional associations based in the United States
Toxicology organizations
Toxicology articles by quality